Big Muff is an album by The Killer Barbies. It was released in 1998 on Toxic Records.

Track listing
 "Lost Control" (4:10)
 "Baby Two Heads" (3:18)
 "Crazy" (4:54)
 "Rage" (3:18)
 "Joyride" (2:40)
 "Set on Fire" (3:21)
 "Crime" (3:11)
 "Hurt Me" (2:49)
 "Going Down" (3:33)
 "You" (2:35)
 "My Brain" (2:32)
 "The Family is Chainsaw" (2:50)

References

External links
 http://killerbarbies.iespana.es/discos2.htm entry for the album in the official discography of the band
 http://lafonoteca.net/discos/big-muff review and description of the release (in Spanish)

The Killer Barbies albums
1998 albums